Fly Creek is a river in Montgomery and Schoharie counties in the state of New York. It begins at an unnamed swamp north of Sloansville and flows into the Schoharie Creek south of Sloansville.

Hydrology
Water in Fly Creek is moderately healthy with an excellent habitat for aquatic life. Due to low levels of urban and commercial development, large wetland areas, and several small private forests the water quality is very good.

References

Rivers of New York (state)
Rivers of Montgomery County, New York
Rivers of Schoharie County, New York